Prothymidia is a genus of beetles in the family Cicindelidae, containing the following species:

 Prothymidia angusticollis (Boheman, 1848)
 Prothymidia foveicollis (W. Horn, 1913)
 Prothymidia gemmipravata (W. Horn, 1914)
 Prothymidia kehmiini Werner, 2003
 Prothymidia putzeysi (W. Horn, 1900)
 Prothymidia sibyllae Schule, 2003
 Prothymidia vuilletorum (W. Horn, 1914)

References

Cicindelidae